Alexey Semyonov may refer to:

Alexey Alexandrovich Semyonov (born 1949), Russian association football player and coach
Alexey Semyonov (mathematician) (born 1950), Russian scientist-mathematician, academician of the Russian Academy of Sciences
Aleksey Semyonov (Uzbekistani footballer) (born 1968), Uzbekistan football defender
Alexei Semenov (born 1981), Russian ice hockey defenceman
Aleksei Vladimirovich Semyonov (born 1983), Russian association football player
Alexei Semyonov (ice hockey) (born 1986), Russian ice hockey goaltender

See also
Semyonov (disambiguation)